San Marino made its Paralympic Games début at the 2012 Summer Paralympics in London, United Kingdom, from August 29 to September 9.

The country was represented by a single athlete, Christian Bernardi, in the shot put, F55 disability category (wheelchair athlete). Bernardi did not qualify for the Games, but received a wildcard invitation so that San Marino could be represented. He did not win a medal.

Athletics 

In his single event, the shot put, Bernardi finished 19th and last, with a throw of 4.54 metres, significantly behind the other competitors.

Men's Field Events

See also
Summer Paralympic disability classification
San Marino at the Paralympics
San Marino at the 2012 Summer Olympics

Notes

Nations at the 2012 Summer Paralympics
2012
Paralympics